The 2021 FIS Freestyle Ski and Snowboarding World Championships were held in Idre, Rogla, Almaty and Aspen with the ski and snowboard cross events held in Idre from 11 to 13 February 2021, the parallel and giant slalom snowboard in Rogla from 1 to 2 March 2021, moguls and aerials held in Almaty from 8 to 11 March 2021, slopestyle, halfpipe and big air events of both Snowboard and Freeski in Aspen from 10 to 16 March 2021. Calgary was selected as a replacement of China to host the halfpipe, big air and slopestyle events, but on 20 January 2021, they pulled out.

Russia doping ban
On 9 December 2019, the World Anti-Doping Agency (WADA) banned Russia from all international sport for a period of four years, after the Russian government was found to have tampered with laboratory data that it provided to WADA in January 2019 as a condition of the Russian Anti-Doping Agency being reinstated. As a result of the ban, WADA plans to allow individually cleared Russian athletes to take part in the 2021-2022 World Championships and 2022 Summer Olympics under a neutral banner, as instigated at the 2018 Winter Olympics, but they will not be permitted to compete in team sports. The title of the neutral banner has yet to be determined; WADA Compliance Review Committee head Jonathan Taylor stated that the IOC would not be able to use "Olympic Athletes from Russia" (OAR) as it did in 2018, emphasizing that neutral athletes cannot be portrayed as representing a specific country. Russia later filed an appeal to the Court of Arbitration for Sport (CAS) against the WADA decision. After reviewing the case on appeal, CAS ruled on 17 December 2020 to reduce the penalty that WADA had placed on Russia. Instead of banning Russia from sporting events, the ruling allowed Russia to participate at the Olympics and other international events, but for a period of two years, the team cannot use the Russian name, flag, or anthem and must present themselves as "Neutral Athlete" or "Neutral Team". The ruling does allow for team uniforms to display "Russia" on the uniform as well as the use of the Russian flag colors within the uniform's design, although the name should be up to equal predominance as the "Neutral Athlete/Team" designation.

Schedule
28 events were held.

Medal summary

Medal table

Freestyle skiing

Men

Women

Mixed

Snowboarding

Men

Women

Mixed

References

 
2021
2021 in freestyle skiing
2021
2021 in snowboarding
2021 in Swedish sport
2021 in Slovenian sport
2021 in Kazakhstani sport
Sports competitions in Almaty
2021 in American sports
2021 in sports in Colorado
February 2021 sports events in Europe
March 2021 sports events in Europe
March 2021 sports events in Asia
March 2021 sports events in the United States